A Must to Avoid was the fourth EP by the band Herman's Hermits; it was released in the United Kingdom by EMI/Columbia (catalogue number SEG 8477.)

Track listing 
Side 1
"A Must to Avoid" (Steve Barri, P.F. Sloan)
"I'm Henry VIII, I Am" (Fred Murray, R. P. Weston)

Side 2
"Just a Little Bit Better" (Kenny Young)
"Walkin' With My Angel" (Gerry Goffin, Carole King)

Personnel 

Keith Hopwood – guitar, vocals
Derek Leckenby – guitar, vocals
Karl Green - bass guitar, vocals
Barry Whitwam – drums
Peter Noone – lead vocals

External links 
plutomusic.com

Herman's Hermits albums
1966 EPs
EMI Records EPs